Igor Vujanović (Serbian Cyrillic: Игор Вујановић; born 13 August 1978) is a Bosnian Serb retired footballer who last played in Denmark for Fremad Amager.

Club career
Before moving to Denmark in 2002, he had trials with clubs including F.C. Copenhagen, and while at Fremad Amager he spent time on loan with Lolland-Falster Alliancen.

References

1978 births
Living people
Serbs of Bosnia and Herzegovina
Association football midfielders
Bosnia and Herzegovina footballers
FK Borac Čačak players
FK Borac Banja Luka players
FK Obilić players
FK Železničar Beograd players
FK Železnik players
FK Remont Čačak players
BK Skjold players
Fremad Amager players
Nykøbing FC players
First League of Serbia and Montenegro players
Second League of Serbia and Montenegro players
Danish 1st Division players
Bosnia and Herzegovina expatriate footballers
Expatriate footballers in Serbia and Montenegro
Bosnia and Herzegovina expatriate sportspeople in Serbia and Montenegro
Expatriate men's footballers in Denmark
Bosnia and Herzegovina expatriate sportspeople in Denmark